The Atlantic Coast Line Railroad's Lakeland—Fort Myers Line was a rail line in Central and Southwest Florida.  It was built incrementally in the late 1800s and early 1900s.  Parts of the line are still active today.

Route description
The Lakeland—Fort Myers Line began at the Atlantic Coast Line's Main Line just east of downtown Lakeland.  From there, it ran southeast to Bartow.  After running though central Bartow, it continued south through Fort Meade, Bowling Green, Wauchula, and Zolfo Springs.  At a point near Gardner, it turned southwest and went through Arcadia to Punta Gorda on the Gulf Coast.  From Punta Gorda, it continued south along the coast to Fort Myers.

Branches
In later years, the line continued south from Fort Myers to Bonita Springs and Naples.  While a continuous line, track south of Fort Myers was classified separately on employee timetables as the Fort Myers Southern Branch.   The Fort Myers Southern Branch extended as far south as Marco Island at its greatest extent.

The Lakeland—Fort Myers Line also connected with the Atlantic Coast Line's Bartow Branch, which ran from Bartow northeast through Winter Haven to the Atlantic Coast Line's Main Line at Lake Alfred.  Many long-distance passenger trains to Southwest Florida often used the Bartow Branch throughout its history.

History

Lakeland to Charlotte Harbor

The northernmost 14 miles of the line from Lakeland to Bartow were built by the South Florida Railroad in September of 1884.  It was the southern leg of the South Florida Railroad's Pemberton Ferry Branch (the northern leg of the branch north of the main line would be part of the High Springs–Lakeland Line).  The Bartow Branch was also built by the South Florida Railroad in 1884.  South of Bartow, the line was originally the Florida Southern Railway's Charlotte Harbor Division.  Both the South Florida Railroad and the Florida Southern Railway eventually became part of Henry B. Plant's system of railroads.  Surveying work to determine the route for the Charlotte Harbor Division was accomplished by Punta Gorda civil engineer Albert W. Gilchrist, who would later serve as Florida's 20th governor.  

The Florida Southern's Charlotte Harbor Division was completed with its first train to its terminus in Punta Gorda (initially known as Trabue) on July 24, 1886.  Plant would go on to open a hotel in Punta Gorda in 1896.  This hotel, the Hotel Punta Gorda, would later be owned by Barron Collier (the namesake of nearby Collier County).

Extension to Fort Myers

Charlotte Harbor was Henry Plant's ultimate goal for his railroad system in Florida.  Despite owning a hotel in Fort Myers, he had no interest in having the line continue beyond Punta Gorda.  Fort Myers was seeking railroad service at the time and had already been established as a city unlike Punta Gorda.  After Plant's death in 1899, his heirs would sell his entire system of railroads to the Atlantic Coast Line Railroad (ACL) in 1902 and serving Fort Myers quickly became a top priority for ACL president Henry Walters.  Construction commenced promptly on an extension to Fort Myers via Tice, which made it the ACL's first expansion of the former Plant System.  The alignment through Tice was selected so the line would cross the wide Caloosahatchee River farther upstream at Beautiful Island, where a series of shorter trestles could be built.  The northernmost trestle originally had a steel swing span built by the American Bridge Company to accommodate river traffic.  Service up to the Caloosahatchee River commenced in 1903.  The first train reached Fort Myers on May 10, 1904, after the completion of the trestles over the river.  Fort Myers would remain the southernmost point of the entire Atlantic Coast Line Railroad system until the Florida land boom of the 1920s.

Fort Myers Southern Branch

Once the land boom was underway, the ACL partnered with a number of local businessmen including advertising entrepreneur Barron Collier, who owned large amounts of land in the newly created Collier County. Through this partnership, they acquired the dormant charter of the unbuilt Fort Myers Southern Railroad (which was chartered in 1918 by the Fort Myers Southern Railroad Company) and used it to extend the line from Fort Myers further south into Collier County.  The Atlantic Coast Line would designate track south of Fort Myers as the Fort Myers Southern Branch, referencing the line's charter.  The line reached Bonita Springs by late 1925 where a depot was built just south of the Imperial River.

The line was further extended to Naples by December 1926, where a depot was built on the east side of town.  The original Naples depot was located on the northeast corner of Airport Road and Radio Road (near Naples Airport).  A turning wye was built in Bonita Springs and for many years, trains terminating in Naples were turned around here and backed down to the original Naples depot since there was no wye there.  The line was built on the east side of town because the Atlantic Coast Line's competitor, the Seaboard Air Line Railroad (SAL), was building a parallel line from Fort Ogden to Fort Myers and Naples via their Seaboard–All Florida Railway subsidiary.  The SAL quietly managed to secure a more ideal right of way to downtown Naples.  SAL's service to Naples commenced eleven days after the ACL, though SAL discontinued service to Naples by 1942.

The line was extended one last time to Collier City on Marco Island in mid 1927.  The line would remain the as the Atlantic Coast Line's southernmost track until 1928, when their parallel Haines City Branch was extended to Everglades City.  

By the end of 1927, the Atlantic Coast Line was running regular passenger train service to Naples.  Service to Marco Island was provided by a mixed train from Fort Myers and Naples.  The Doxsee Clam Cannery was the railroad's main freight customer on Marco Island.  A wye was also built on Marco Island.

When the Seaboard Air Line discontinued service to Naples in 1942, the Atlantic Coast Line took advantage of an opportunity to serve downtown Naples.  By 1944, the Atlantic Coast Line abandoned the Fort Myers Southern Branch from Marco Island to a point near Vanderbilt Beach.  The ACL then extended the remaining line from Vanderbilt Beach down the ex-SAL right of way (along Goodlette-Frank Road) to Downtown Naples and relocated service to the SAL's Naples depot on Fifth Avenue South.  The original Naples depot on Airport Road was closed as a result and was later demolished in the 1970s.

Later Years
The Atlantic Coast Line's Gulf Coast Special and West Coast Champion were notable passenger services to operate on the line from Bartow to Naples.  At this time, passenger trains were running the Bartow Branch north of Bartow to access the ACL's main line at Lake Alfred.  By 1949, the Atlantic Coast Line operated a daily local passenger train and a daily freight train along the line from Bartow to Fort Myers.  The ACL operated mixed train service from Fort Myers to Naples six days a week.

In the 1950s–1960s, the ACL ran a daily passenger train between Lakeland and Naples via Fort Myers, with through cars from New York coming off the Tampa-bound section of the West Coast Champion at Lakeland. In the Spring 1967 timetable, southbound train #291 left Lakeland at 3:05 pm, arriving at Punta Gorda 4:55 pm, Fort Myers at 5:40 pm, and Naples at 6:50 pm.

The Atlantic Coast Line became the Seaboard Coast Line Railroad (SCL) after merging with the Seaboard Air Line Railroad in 1967 (which ironically brought the Seaboard brand back to the Naples depot).  The Seaboard Coast Line adopted the Seaboard Air Line's method of naming their lines as subdivisions which resulted in the full line from Lakeland to Naples being designated the Fort Myers Subdivision (a name which the Seaboard Air Line had previously used on their own line to Fort Myers which was abandoned in 1952).  The Bartow Branch was designated as the Bartow Subdivision.  The SCL briefly continued to operate a daily passenger train and a local freight train six days a week between Lakeland and Naples.  However, intercity passenger service to Southwest Florida was discontinued in 1971 upon the creation of Amtrak, who opted not to serve Southwest Florida.

In 1977, the swing bridge over the Caloosahatchee River in Tice was replaced by the current bascule bridge.  In 1979, the Seaboard Coast Line abandoned the southernmost 10 miles of the line from its terminus at the Naples depot to a point just north of Immokalee Road in North Naples.

In 1980, the Seaboard Coast Line's parent company merged with the Chessie System, creating the CSX Corporation.  The CSX Corporation initially operated the Chessie and Seaboard Systems separately until 1986, when they were merged into CSX Transportation.  During the transition into CSX, the company sought to abandon many redundant routes and sell others to shortline railroads.  As a result, the line was abandoned Between Bowling Green and Arcadia in 1984.  The remaining track south of Arcadia, which was sold to the shortline Seminole Gulf Railway in 1987, is still connected to the rest of the CSX network via the former Charlotte Harbor and Northern Railway.

Current conditions

Today, the former Lakeland—Fort Myers Line remains in three discontinuous sections.

At the north end, the line is still in service from Lakeland to Eaton Park.  This segment is now CSX's CH Spur.

From Homeland to Bowling Green, the line is still in service and it is now the southeastern end of CSX's Valrico Subdivision.  This segment of the line still carries large amounts of phosphate from The Mosaic Company's South Fort Meade mine.    Track from the entrance to the mine to Bowling Green (at a point just 100 yards north of the Bowling Green depot) is still in place but is out of service.  Much of U.S. Route 17 has been widened into the former right of way between Bowling Green and Arcadia.

The most substantial segment of the line that is still remains is from Arcadia to North Naples.  This segment has been operated by Seminole Gulf Railway since 1987, which carries mixed freight to Southwest Florida.  However, the southernmost 15 miles of the Seminole Gulf from Alico Road (near San Carlos Park) to North Naples is currently inactive and has not had any active shippers since around 2008.

Further south, Goodlette-Frank Road runs along the post-1944 former right of way from Immokalee Road to Downtown Naples near the Naples depot.

State Road 951 runs along the former route from the Tamiami Trail to Marco Island.  Near Marco Island, a small sandbar named "Railroad Islet" and the "Railroad Shoals" mark the former location of the railroad's bridge to the island, which was located just east of the S.S. Jolley Bridge.

Part of the Bartow Branch remains today from Winter Haven south to Gordonville (just northeast of Bartow).  This segment is operated by the Florida Midland Railroad.  The abandoned segment between Lake Alfred and Winter Haven is now the route of the Chain of Lakes Trail.

Historic stations

See also
Main Line (Atlantic Coast Line Railroad)
Haines City Branch

References

Atlantic Coast Line Railroad
Rail infrastructure in Florida